Smižany is a large village and municipality in the Spišská Nová Ves District in the Košice Region of central-eastern Slovakia.

History
Excavations in Čingov, just south of the village, have found traces of Stone Age settlement. The village was settled by German settlers in 1242. There is a Romanesque church of the 13th century.

Geography
The village lies at an altitude of 485 metres and covers an area of 45.704 km².
In 2011 had a population of 8698 inhabitants and is the largest municipality without a town status in Slovakia.

Twin towns — sister cities

Smižany is twinned with:
 Borsodnádasd, Hungary
 Kamienica, Poland
 Komorniki, Poland

References

External links
 Municipal website